Jean Damphousse (born June 24, 1952) is a politician from Quebec, Canada. He was an Action démocratique du Québec Member of the National Assembly for the electoral district of Maskinongé from 2007 to 2008.

Born in Saint-Paulin, Quebec, Damphousse holds a bachelor's degree in business administration from the Université du Québec à Trois-Rivières and a master's degree in project management from the Université de Sherbrooke. He was the owner of several local firms in the Maskinongé and Saint-Ursule areas.

Before his election, he served as mayor of Sainte-Ursule as well as a councillor. He also worked for the Chamber of Commerce of Louiseville, the Maskinongé Municipal Regional Counsel, and the Maskinongé health and social service center.

Damphousse was first elected in the 2007 election with 40% of the vote. Liberal incumbent Francine Gaudet finished second with 29% of the vote. Damphousse took office on April 12, 2007.

In the 2012 election he ran unsuccessfully for the CAQ in Maskinongé.

References

External links
 

1952 births
Action démocratique du Québec MNAs
Living people
Mayors of places in Quebec
Université de Sherbrooke alumni
Université du Québec à Trois-Rivières alumni
21st-century Canadian politicians